Sacred Heart of Mary High School may refer to:

Sacred Heart of Mary High School, a former high school in Rolling Meadows, IL, which merged with St. Viator High School in 1987
Sacred Heart of Mary High School (Montebello), a former all-girl high school which merged with Cantwell High School in 1991 to form Cantwell-Sacred Heart of Mary High School